Eremurus robustus, the foxtail lily or giant desert candle, is a species of flowering plant in the asphodel family, native to the Tien Shan and Pamir Mountains in central Asia that is often used as an ornamental plant.

The deciduous leaves can vary from a bright green to a bluish-green in color. At the base of the flower is a brown blotch with a green keel. The lower flowers have long pedicels, with shorter ones higher up. The flowers, as many as 700 to 800 of them, bloom in June. By the time of flowering, the leaves will usually have already shrivelled.

The Latin specific epithet robustus means “sturdy, growing strongly”.

The plant was introduced from Central Asia to Europe and North America in 1874 and is popular in gardens.  However some may find the plant to be too tall for normal gardens.  It prefers sandy, well-drained soil and full sun.

In cultivation in the UK this plant has gained the Royal Horticultural Society’s Award of Garden Merit.

Notes

References

External links

Asphodeloideae
Flora of Central Asia
Garden plants of Asia